Jenny Orléans was a French actress.

Filmography 
1953: Les Enfants de l'amour (by Léonide Moguy)
1957: Lovers of Paris (by Julien Duvivier) - Rose Compardon (uncredited)
1958: Me and the Colonel (by Peter Glenville) - Nun (uncredited)
1958: Der eiserne Gustav (by George Hurdalek) - Dicke Französin
1959: Babette Goes to War (by Christian-Jaque) - Girl / Une fille
1960: Goodbye Again (by Anatole Litvak)
1960: Un couple (by Jean-Pierre Mocky) - Julie
1962: Les Trois Chapeaux claques (by Jean-Pierre Marchand : Mme Olga) (TV movie) - Mme Olga
1963: La Vie à l'envers (by Alain Jessua) - La concierge
1964: La Cité de l'indicible peur (by Jean-Pierre Mocky) - Madame Gosseran
1964: Tintin and the Blue Oranges (by Philippe Condroyer) - La Castafiore
1964: Déclic et des claques (by Philippe Clair)
1964: Me and the Forty Year Old Man (by Jack Pinoteau) - La voisine de Bénéchol
1965: The Sleeping Car Murders (by Costa-Gavras) - La soeur de René Cabourg
1965: Lady L (by Peter Ustinov) - Blonde girl (uncredited)
1965: La Bonne Occase (by Michel Drach)
1966: Sale temps pour les mouches... (by Guy Lefranc)
1967: Les Grandes Vacances (by Jean Girault)
1967: The Night of the Generals (by Anatole Litvak) - Otto's Wife
1968: Time to Live (by Bernard Paul) (cut) (TV movie) - La servante
1970: L'Ardoise (by Claude Bernard-Aubert)

Theatre 
1954: La Matinée d'un homme de lettres (by Tania Balachova after Anton Tchekhov, directed by Tania Balachova, Théâtre de la Huchette)
1956: Les Amants puérils (by Fernand Crommelynck, directed by Tania Balachova, Théâtre des Noctambules)
1959: Les Trois Chapeaux claque (by Miguel Mihura, directed by Olivier Hussenot, Théâtre de l'Alliance française)
1959: Un joueur (by André Charpak after Fyodor Dostoyevsky, directed by André Charpak, Théâtre de l'Alliance française)
1960: L'Etouffe-Chrétien (by Félicien Marceau, directed by André Barsacq, Théâtre de la Renaissance)
1961: Gorgonio (by Tullio Pinelli, directed by Claude Sainval, Théâtre des Champs-Élysées)

External links 

French film actresses
French stage actresses
1932 births
2008 deaths